The 1968 Tour de France started with 110 cyclists, divided into 11 teams of 10 cyclists:
 France A
 France B
 France C
 Germany
 Belgium A
 Belgium B
 Spain
 Great Britain
 Italy
 Netherlands
 Switzerland/Luxembourg (combined)

Start list

By team

By rider

By nationality

References

1968 Tour de France
1968